Marek Marian Belka (born 9 January 1952 in Lódź) is a Polish professor of economics and politician who has served as Prime Minister of Poland and Finance Minister of Poland in two governments. He is a former Director of the International Monetary Fund's (IMF) European Department and former Head of Narodowy Bank Polski (National Bank of Poland). He has served as a Member of the European Parliament (MEP) since July 2019.

In 1978–1979 and 1985–1986 he did scientific internships at Columbia University and University of Chicago, and in 1990 - London School of Economics. From 1986, he was associated with Institute of Economics of the Polish Academy of Sciences.  He published over 100 scientific papers devoted mainly to money theory and anti-inflation policy in developing countries. He specializes in applied economics and contemporary economic thought. He is also a member of the Committee of Economic Sciences of the Polish Academy of Sciences.

He held a number of important public functions in the country and abroad. In 1990 he became an advisor and consultant at Ministry of Finance, followed by the Ministry of Ownership Transformations and the Central Planning Office. In the years 1994–1996 he was the vice-chairman of the Council of Socio-Economic Strategy at the Council of Ministers, and then economic advisor to the President of the Republic of Poland Aleksander Kwaśniewski. In 1996 he became a consultant World Bank. He was twice Deputy Prime Minister of the Republic of Poland and Minister of Finance: in 1997 in Cabinet of Włodzimierz Cimoszewicz and in 2001–2002 in Cabinet of Leszek Miller. In 2004–2005 he served as Prime Minister and the chairman of the Committee for European Integration. In 2005 he held the office of the Minister of Sport in his own government .

From 2006 executive secretary of the UN Economic Commission for Europe (UNECE), and from November 2008 director of the European Department International Monetary Fund. Previously, he was also the head of the coalition Council for International Coordination in Iraq (2003), and then the director of economic policy in the Provisional Coalition Authority in Iraq, where he answered, among others for currency reform, creation of a new banking system and supervision of the economy (2003-2004).

He was appointed president of the National Bank of Poland. He took office on 11 June 2010 and ended his term on 21 June 2016. In January 2011, he was elected for a three-year term (extended for another three years in 2014) to Steering Committee European Systemic Risk Board. Belka ran for and was elected an MEP at the 2019 European Parliament election. He has been appointed the vice-president of the S&D Group.

Early life and education
Belka graduated from the Socio-Economic Department of the University of Łódź in 1972 and later studied on scholarships at Columbia University, University of Chicago and London School of Economics. He holds an M.A. in economics of foreign trade and a PhD in economics from the University of Łódź; his thesis was on US anti-inflationary policy. He became a professor in 1994.

Early career
From 1990 until 1996 Belka worked as consultant for the Ministry of Finance of the Republic of Poland and the World Bank. He served as Deputy Prime Minister and Minister of Finance in 1997 and from 2001 to 2002; and as an economic consultant of the President of the Republic of Poland in the meantime. He also served as Adviser to the three successive Prime Ministers of Albania – Fatos Nano, Pandeli Majko and Ilir Meta – from 1997 to 2001.

Later, Belka worked as an advisor to JP Morgan for Central and Eastern Europe from 2002 to 2003. In 2003 he was responsible for economic policy in the interim Coalition Provisional Authority of Iraq.

Political career

Career in national politics 
Belka was active in the Polish Students' Association and the Polish Socialist Youth Union. From 1973 to 1990 he was a member of the Polish United Workers' Party. In the 1980s he was the first secretary of the Polish United Workers' Party at the University of Łódź.

Belka was designated Prime Minister of Poland by President Aleksander Kwaśniewski on 29 March 2004 and sworn into office the next 2 May. He failed to receive the required parliamentary support on 14 May, but on 11 June he was designated again. On 24 June he finally managed to receive enough support in the Sejm – the Lower House of Polish Parliament – winning a vote of confidence by a majority of 235 votes to 215.

Belka joined the new liberal Democratic Party - demokraci.pl in May 2005, but failed to win a seat in Łódź in the 2005 elections. Also in 2005, he was a candidate for the post of OECD Secretary General, but lost to José Ángel Gurría.

Career in international organizations 
From 2006 to 2008, Belka served as Executive Secretary of the UN Economic Commission for Europe (ECE).

In 2007, Belka was proposed by Poland as managing director of the International Monetary Fund (IMF), but the European Union (EU) finally decided to advance former French minister Dominique Strauss-Kahn's candidacy.

On 15 July 2008, Strauss-Kahn named Belka as Director of the IMF's European Department, a position Belka took up on 1 November 2008. In this capacity, he led the fund's response to the global economic crisis in Europe.

President of the National Bank of Poland, 2010–2016 
On 27 May 2010 Belka was nominated as the next President of the National Bank of Poland by Acting President Bronisław Komorowski. On 10 June 2010, he was approved by the Parliament (253 votes in favor; 184 against) as Head of National Bank of Poland.

In June 2014, the Polish magazine Wprost published a series of transcripts of secret recordings involving senior Polish government officials, including one in which Belka discussed the forthcoming 2015 election with the interior minister Bartłomiej Sienkiewicz. Belka said he would not resign over the remarks he is alleged to have made.  The secret recordings were believed to have been made in one or more restaurants in the capital, Warsaw, and thought to date back as far as Summer 2013.

In 2016, news media reported that Belka was considering taking up the role of the head of the European Bank for Reconstruction and Development (EBRD). He was also a member of the Eminent Persons Group on Global Financial Governance, which was established by the G20 Finance Ministers and Central Bank Governors for the period from 2017 to 2018.

Member of the European Parliament, 2019-present
In the 2019 European Parliament election Belka was elected as the MEP for the Łódź constituency. In Parliament, he has since been serving on the Committee on Economic and Monetary Affairs. In 2020, he also joined the Subcommittee on Tax Matters.

In addition to his committee assignments, Belka is a member of the delegation for relations with the United States. He is also a member of the URBAN Intergroup.

Other activities

International organizations
 European Investment Bank (EIB), Member of the Appointment Advisory Committee (since 2017)
 European Systemic Risk Board (ESRB), Member of the Steering Committee (2011-2016)
 European Bank for Reconstruction and Development (EBRD), Ex-Officio Member of the Board of Governors (2010-2016)
 Joint World Bank-IMF Development Committee, Chairman (2011-2015)
 European Bank Coordination Initiative (EBCI, Vienna Initiative 2), Chairman of the Steering Committee (2013-2016)

Corporate boards
 Echo Polska Properties, Independent Member of the Board of Directors (since 2016)
 Bank Millennium, Member of the Supervisory Board (2002-2004)
 LOT Polish Airlines, Chairman of the Board of Directors (2002-2003)

Non-profit organizations
 Berggruen Institute, Member of the Council for the Future of Europe
 Museum Berggruen, Member of the International Council
 Trilateral Commission, Member of the European Group
 Polish-American Freedom Foundation, Member of the Board of Directors (2000-2010)

Recognition
Belka received an Honorary Doctorate from Heriot-Watt University in 2006.

Belka is an Honorary Member of the International Raoul Wallenberg Foundation. In October 2013 he was elected into the Polish Economy Hall of Fame.

Personal life
Belka is married and has two children. The family lives in Łódź.

References

External links
Marsh, David, "Poles won’t reject euro, but won’t rush to join", MarketWatch, 22 October 2012.

|-

|-

|-

1952 births
Alumni of the London School of Economics
Columbia University alumni
Democratic Left Alliance politicians
Democratic Party – demokraci.pl politicians
Deputy Prime Ministers of Poland
Finance Ministers of Poland
Governors of the National Bank of Poland
International Monetary Fund people
Living people
MEPs for Poland 2019–2024
Polish officials of the United Nations
Polish United Workers' Party members
Politicians from Łódź
Prime Ministers of Poland
University of Łódź alumni
World Bank people
Recipients of the National Order of Merit (Romania)
Chevening Scholars